Michael Thomas Lynskey is a New Zealand academic and psychiatrist. He is Professor of Addictions in the National Addictions Centre at the Institute of Psychiatry, Psychology and Neuroscience of King's College London in the United Kingdom. He has previously held positions at the National Drug and Alcohol Research Centre of the University of New South Wales in Australia and at the Department of Psychiatry at the Washington University School of Medicine in the United States. He trained in New Zealand, where he graduated from the University of Otago and the University of Canterbury and worked on the Christchurch Health and Development study.

References

External links
Faculty page

Living people
New Zealand psychiatrists
University of Otago alumni
University of Canterbury alumni
Academics of King's College London
Cannabis researchers
Writers on addiction
New Zealand emigrants to the United Kingdom
Year of birth missing (living people)